Seamus Liam Davey-Fitzpatrick (born December 29, 1998) is an American actor. His first film role was as Damien Thorn in the 2006 remake of the thriller The Omen.

Personal life
Davey-Fitzpatrick was born in New York City, and moved with his family to East Stroudsburg, Pennsylvania, where he was raised. He is of Irish descent. His parents are James Hugh Fitzpatrick, an actor and model, and Marty Davey, an actress. He began acting in commercials for Marriott and Flintstone vitamins, and briefly appeared in an episode of the television series Sex and the City. He also plays Damien in the Barclays Show from 2021+

Career
During the filming of The Omen, Davey-Fitzpatrick was never told that his character was supposed to be the son of the Devil; co-star Julia Stiles has commented that it was because the filmmakers thought "he was too young to understand it".

Davey-Fitzpatrick once acted, along with his parents, in a local short film The Lottery, an eleven-minute adaptation of Shirley Jackson's short story. He played Will Winslow on Guiding Light before the series' cancellation, and worked with Robert De Niro in Everybody's Fine, a film released in 2009. He has appeared in such television series as Law & Order, Sex and the City, Damages, The Black Donnellys, and Person of Interest. He played the 14-year-old son of Jesse (played by Ethan Hawke) in the feature film Before Midnight (2013).

Filmography

References

External links

1998 births
21st-century American male actors
American male child actors
American male film actors
American people of Irish descent
Living people
Male actors from New York City
People from East Stroudsburg, Pennsylvania